Târnava is a commune located in Sibiu County, Transylvania, Romania. It is composed of two villages, Colonia Târnava (Nagyekemezőtelep) and Târnava (formerly Proștea Mare).

The commune is situated on the Transylvanian Plateau. It lies on the banks of the river Târnava Mare, in the northern part of the county, right in between the city of Mediaș and the town of Copșa Mică. 

Târnava is crossed by National Road , which connects the county seat, Sibiu, to Sighișoara in Mureș County. There is also a train station that serves Line 300 of the CFR network, which connects Bucharest with the Hungarian border near Oradea.

At the 2011 census, 64.6% of inhabitants were Romanians, 31.5% Roma, 2.7% Hungarians and 1.1% Germans.

References

Communes in Sibiu County
Localities in Transylvania